Sir Nigel Barnard Hawthorne  (5 April 1929 – 26 December 2001) was an English actor. He is known for his stage acting and his portrayal of Sir Humphrey Appleby, the permanent secretary in the 1980s sitcom Yes Minister and the Cabinet Secretary in its sequel, Yes, Prime Minister. For this role, he won four BAFTA TV Awards for Best Light Entertainment Performance.

He won the BAFTA Award for Best Actor in a Leading Role and was nominated for the Academy Award for Best Actor for portraying King George III in The Madness of King George (1994). He later won the BAFTA TV Award for Best Actor, for the 1996 series The Fragile Heart. He was also an Olivier Award and Tony Award winner for his work in theatre.

Early life
Hawthorne was born in Coventry, Warwickshire, England, the second of four children of Agnes Rosemary (née Rice) and Charles Barnard Hawthorne, a physician. 

When Nigel was three years old, the family moved to Cape Town, South Africa, where his father had bought a practice. Initially they lived in the Gardens and then moved to a newly built house near Camps Bay.

He attended St George's Grammar School, Cape Town, and, although the family was not Catholic, at a now-defunct Christian Brothers College, where he played on the rugby team. He described his time at the latter as not being a particularly happy experience. 

He enrolled at the University of Cape Town, where he met and sometimes acted in plays with Theo Aronson (later a well-known biographer), but withdrew and returned to the United Kingdom in the 1950s to pursue a career in acting.

Career
Hawthorne made his professional stage debut in 1950, playing Archie Fellows in a Cape Town production of The Shop at Sly Corner. Unhappy in South Africa, he decided to move to London, where he performed in various small parts before becoming recognized as a great character actor.

Finding success in London, Hawthorne decided to try his luck in New York City and eventually got a part in a 1974 production of As You Like It on Broadway. Around this time, he was persuaded by Ian McKellen and Judi Dench to join the Royal Shakespeare Company. He also supplemented his income by appearing in television advertisements, including one for Mackeson Stout.

He returned to the New York stage in 1990 in Shadowlands and won the 1991 Tony Award for Best Actor in a Play.

Although Hawthorne had appeared in small roles in various British television series since the late 1950s, his most famous role was as Sir Humphrey Appleby, the Permanent Secretary of the fictional Department of Administrative Affairs in the television series Yes Minister (and Cabinet Secretary in its sequel, Yes, Prime Minister), for which he won four BAFTA awards during the 1980s. He became a household name throughout the United Kingdom, which finally opened the doors to film roles. In 1982, Hawthorne appeared in Richard Attenborough's Gandhi, alongside a distinguished international cast including Martin Sheen, John Mills, Candice Bergen, John Gielgud, Ian Charleson and Ben Kingsley.  That same year, he starred opposite Clint Eastwood in the cold war thriller Firefox, where he played a dissident Russian scientist.

Other film roles during this time included Demolition Man, which he detested for being "brainless" and a "cheap picture". However, it led to his most famous role: that of King George III in Alan Bennett's stage play The Madness of George III (for which he won a Best Actor Olivier Award) and then the film adaptation entitled The Madness of King George, for which he received an Academy Award nomination for Best Actor and won the BAFTA Film Award for Best Actor.

After this success, his friend Ian McKellen asked him to play his doomed brother Clarence in Richard III, and Steven Spielberg asked him to play lame duck president Martin Van Buren in Amistad. He won a sixth BAFTA for the 1996 TV mini-series The Fragile Heart. He also drew praise for his role of Georgie Pillson in the London Weekend Television series "Mapp and Lucia."

Hawthorne was also a voice actor, and lent his voice to two Disney films: Fflewddur Fflam in The Black Cauldron (1985) and Professor Porter in Tarzan (1999). He also voiced Captain Campion in the animated film adaptation of Watership Down (1978).

Personal life
An intensely private person, he was annoyed at having been outed as gay in 1995 in the publicity surrounding the Academy Awards, but he did attend the ceremony with his long-time partner Trevor Bentham, and afterward, he spoke openly about being gay in interviews and in his autobiography, Straight Face, which was published posthumously.

They met in 1968 when Bentham was stage-managing the Royal Court Theatre. From 1979 until Hawthorne's death in 2001, they lived together in Radwell and then at Thundridge, both in Hertfordshire. The two of them became fund raisers for the North Hertfordshire hospice and other local charities.

Death
Hawthorne died from a heart attack at his home on 26 December 2001, aged 72. He had recently undergone several operations for pancreatic cancer, which he was diagnosed with in mid-2000, but had been discharged from hospital for the Christmas holidays. He was survived by Bentham, and his funeral service was held at St Mary's, the Parish Church of Thundridge near Ware, Hertfordshire, following which he was cremated at Stevenage Crematorium. His funeral was attended by Derek Fowlds, Maureen Lipman, Charles Dance, Loretta Swit and Frederick Forsyth along with friends and local people. The service was led by the Right Reverend Christopher Herbert, the Bishop of St Albans. The coffin had a wreath of white lilies and orchids and Bentham was one of the pallbearers.

On hearing of Hawthorne's death, Alan Bennett described him in his diary: "Courteous, grand, a man of the world and superb at what he did, with his technique never so obvious as to become familiar as, say, Olivier's did or Alec Guinness's."

Honours
He was appointed a Commander of the Order of the British Empire (CBE) in the 1987 New Years Honours List, and was knighted in the 1999 New Years Honours List.

Filmography

Film

Television

Video games

Stage

Theatre

Awards and nominations

References

External links

1929 births
2001 deaths
20th-century English male actors
Actors awarded knighthoods
Actors from Coventry
Audiobook narrators
Best Actor BAFTA Award winners
Best Actor BAFTA Award (television) winners
Best Entertainment Performance BAFTA Award (television) winners
Burials in Hertfordshire
Commanders of the Order of the British Empire
Critics' Circle Theatre Award winners
English autobiographers
English expatriates in South Africa
English male film actors
English male Shakespearean actors
English male stage actors
English male television actors
English male voice actors
English gay actors
Knights Bachelor
Laurence Olivier Award winners
Male actors from Cape Town
Male actors from Warwickshire
People from East Hertfordshire District
People from North Hertfordshire District
University of Cape Town alumni
Royal Shakespeare Company members
Tony Award winners